Christine Walters (born 17 June 1991) is an Australian football player, who played for Canberra United FC in the Australian W-League.

Honours

International
Australia
 AFF Women's Championship: 2008

References

1991 births
Living people
Australian women's soccer players
Canberra United FC players
Sportspeople from Canberra
Soccer players from the Australian Capital Territory
Women's association football defenders